Nowitzki and  Nowizki are Germanized forms of the Polish surname Nowicki, also spread across the Baltic region. Notable people with the name include:

Dirk Nowitzki (born 1978), German professional basketball player
Helga Nowitzki, German professional basketball player; mother of Dirk and Silke
Silke Nowitzki (born 1974), German professional basketball player
Tamara Nowitzki (born 1976), Australian swimmer

Fictional characters

Ramona Nowitzki, a character from the sitcom The Big Bang Theory

See also
Novitsky
 Nowicki

German-language surnames
Surnames of Polish origin